CeCe Rogers (born Kenneth Jesse Rogers III, April 30, 1962), is a two time Grammy nominated American singer, songwriter and record producer from Cleveland, Ohio, United States.

He was given the nickname CeCe by James Brown, who watched him performing at 11 years of age, imitating Chubby Checker. He is considered one of the most popular male vocalists in house music. In 1987, he recorded the track "Someday" in collaboration with Marshall Jefferson, an anthem of house music, having been rated number 3 in Mixmag's 100 Greatest Singles of All Time.

His track "All Join Hands" became popular in 1991, after Laurent Garnier began to mix it with Pulsation's "Transpulsation".

Early life
Rogers attended Shaw High School in East Cleveland, Ohio and Berklee College of Music, in Boston, Massachusetts. He began studying piano at the age of five. His mother, a music teacher, introduced him to gospel, the genre that forms his musical foundation. He was considered a child prodigy and at the age of nine, he was a featured musician on the weekly television program, The Gene Carroll Show.

Moving to the New York area in 1984, he taught voice and piano, as well as doing session work with such artists as Melba Moore, Freddie Jackson, and Curtis Hairston. He also formed his own group, CeCe & Company, whose repertoire included jazz and R&B tunes. Some of the group's vocalist at the time were Sybil Lynch, Adeva, and Kenny Bobien.

Recording career
In 1987, Rogers recorded the track "Someday" with its songwriter, Marshall Jefferson, and was then signed to Atlantic Records, making "Someday" the first house-music song released by a major label.

Not realizing the massive appeal house music was having in Europe, Rogers moved away from the house scene and released his debut album, CeCe Rogers, in 1989. The album was a mix of contemporary R&B and house tracks that received rave reviews but poor sales. His second album, Never Give Up (1991), also failed to chart selling only 300,000 units. He was dropped from Atlantic and went back to doing session work singing backgrounds for TV commercials. In 1993, David Morales recruited Rogers to work on his debut album, Games. He worked on many of Morales's remix projects including "The Best Things In Life Are Free" by Janet Jackson and Luther Vandross, and the soundtrack of Sister Act. Rogers has written and produced many songs with his friend and business partner, Marshall Jefferson.

In 1989, Rogers wrote the UK hit single, "Got to Get You Back" for Kym Mazelle.

The house scene grew quickly, starting out in Chicago and establishing roots in New Jersey. Soulful house became popular in Europe when Rogers toured with Jefferson.

In 1994, Rogers recorded a string of hits with the Italian band Jestofunk. This would lead to three world tours. After five years with Jestofunk, Rogers decided to stop touring and give teaching a try. Seeing the need for more African American male teachers in the urban community, Rogers taught music production for eight years at the Essex County Vocational School in New Jersey. He became a supervisor for the district and formed a gospel choir that won many competitions, including the McDonald's Gospelfest and Cherry Blossom music festival.

Discography

Albums
 CeCe Rogers - Atlantic 82021 (1989)
 Never Give Up - Atlantic 82286 (1991)
 Key of Ce - USB Records (2017)

Singles

As featured artist

References

External links
 

20th-century African-American male singers
American house musicians
1962 births
Living people
Atlantic Records artists
Musicians from Cleveland
21st-century African-American people